Filigonia Tol (born 23 March 1951) is a Romanian rower. She competed in two events at the 1976 Summer Olympics.

References

1951 births
Living people
Romanian female rowers
Olympic rowers of Romania
Rowers at the 1976 Summer Olympics
Place of birth missing (living people)